The Chevrolet Triax is a concept sport utility vehicle created by Chevrolet. It was shown at the 2000 North American International Auto Show.

The Triax uses a 0.66 L V3 engine with normal aspiration and induction. It uses an AWD automatic transmission with a total of four gears. The Triax has three different propulsion systems. It lets the driver switch between four-wheel-drive electric, four-wheel-drive hybrid electric or two-wheel-drive internal combustion.

References
Triax info from ConceptCarz.com
SUPERCARS.NET: A Description of the Chevrolet Triax Concept

Chevrolet concept vehicles